Dave Widow (born Cincinnati, Ohio) is an American singer, guitarist, and songwriter.

Early career
As a child, Widow grew up in Cincinnati, Ohio. He began playing guitar at nine years old and began performing professionally at age thirteen. He later joined a bar band called the Meltones.

Widow moved to Los Angeles in 1988.

Career

Widow has performed with his band, Dave Widow and the Lineup at numerous venues in Southern California including the House of Blues, and continues to play live shows throughout the United States and internationally.

Dave Widow, teaches guitar apprentices at a workshop called Down to the Crossroads. The workshop at the Shack Up Inn was founded in the heart of the Mississippi Delta to help blues guitarists attain a deeper connection with the form, characterized by specific chord progressions. Widow serves as one of three coaches mentoring students to expand their technical abilities.

Albums
The latest album release by Widow, 2012's Waiting for the World to End includes supporting appearances by Bill Champlin, Mike Finnigan, Barry Goldberg, Reggie McBride and James Gadson.
Widow also released an album in 2002, Got it Covered.

Personal life
As of 1988, Widow has resided in Los Angeles.

Discography
2012 Waiting for the World to End
2002 Got it Covered
1999 (Marty Grebb) Smooth Sailing

References

External links
Dave Widow official website
Interview with Dave Widow at All Access Magazine.com

Living people
American male composers
21st-century American composers
American blues guitarists
American rhythm and blues guitarists
American male guitarists
American rock guitarists
American session musicians
American male singers
Year of birth missing (living people)
21st-century American male musicians